Nyassachromis microcephalus is a species of cichlid endemic to Lake Malawi where it prefers areas with sandy substrates.  This species can reach a length of  TL.  It can also be found in the aquarium trade.

References

microcephalus
Fish described in 1935
Taxonomy articles created by Polbot